Road signs in Malta are standardised by Transport Malta. Although Malta is not a signatory to the Vienna Convention on Road Signs and Signals, road signs conform to a pattern used by many other European countries, with the notable exception of Ireland.

Gallery

Warning signs

Prohibitory signs & Mandatory signs

Informational signs

Additional panels

Traffic light signal

References 

Malta